Lloyd Otto Appleton (February 1, 1906 – March 17, 1999) was an American wrestler who competed in the 1928 Summer Olympics. Appleton was born in Edgewood, Iowa and died in Oberlin, Ohio. In 1983, Appleton was inducted into the National Wrestling Hall of Fame as a Distinguished Member.

References

External links
Olympic Profile

1906 births
1999 deaths
Wrestlers at the 1928 Summer Olympics
American male sport wrestlers
Olympic silver medalists for the United States in wrestling
People from Iowa
Medalists at the 1928 Summer Olympics